The two South Australian Railways F Class (1st) locomotives were built in England in 1869 by the Avonside Engine Company of Bristol. No. 21 entered service on the South Australian Railways in September 1869; No. 22 followed in October.

The locomotives' initial role was to take over hauling goods trains from the A class locomotives on the new Roseworthy to Tarlee line. They operated on the Port Adelaide and in the Adelaide hills, where they pulled passenger and goods trains. Near the end of their short working life they shunted in the Adelaide Yards. In 1892, the engines were being rebuilt when a workshop crane lifted them without using hornplates, dropping and seriously damaging them in the process; they were declared to be beyond repair and scrapped afterwards.

Ten years later, a second group of locomotives, a suburban tank with a 4-6-2 wheel arrangement, took on the "F" class classification.

References 

F
Broad gauge locomotives in Australia
Avonside locomotives
4-4-0T locomotives
Railway locomotives introduced in 1869

 
Scrapped locomotives